Atrypa is a genus of brachiopod with shells round to short egg-shaped, covered with many fine radial ridges (or costae), that split further out and growth lines perpendicular to the costae and 2-3 times wider spaced. The pedunculate valve is a little convex, but tends to level out or even become slightly concave toward the anterior margin (that is: opposite hinge and pedicle). The brachial valve is highly convex. There is no interarea (that is a flat area bordering the hinge line approximately perpendicular with the rest of the valve) in either valve. Atrypa was a cosmopolitan and occurred from the late Lower Silurian (Telychian) to the early Upper Devonian (Frasnian). Other sources expand the range from the Late Ordovician to Carboniferous, approximately from 449 to 336 Ma. A proposed new species, A. harrisi, was found in the trilobite-rich Floresta Formation in Boyacá, Colombia.

Reassigned species 
As Atrypa was erected early on, many species have been reassigned since.

Organic content of Atrypa fossils 
In some fossil material, organic compounds may be preserved. Only the more stable amino acids tend to be preserved in very old fossils. In specimens of Atrypa reticularis from the Wenlock Shales (Lower Silurian), alanine, glycine, glutamic acid, leucine, isoleucine, proline, valine, and aspartic acid have been found.

Gallery

See also

References 

Prehistoric brachiopod genera
Silurian brachiopods
Devonian brachiopods
Paleozoic animals of Africa
Paleozoic animals of Asia
Paleozoic brachiopods of Oceania
Paleozoic animals of Europe
Paleozoic animals of North America
Paleozoic brachiopods of South America
Devonian Colombia
Fossils of Afghanistan
Fossils of Australia
Fossils of Austria
Fossils of Belarus
Fossils of Belgium
Fossils of Canada
Fossils of China
Fossils of Colombia
Fossils of the Czech Republic
Fossils of Estonia
Fossils of France
Fossils of Germany
Fossils of Greenland
Fossils of India
Fossils of Iran
Fossils of Ireland
Fossils of Italy
Fossils of Japan
Fossils of Kazakhstan
Fossils of Latvia
Fossils of Lithuania
Fossils of Mexico
Fossils of Mongolia
Fossils of Morocco
Fossils of Myanmar
Fossils of Norway
Fossils of Peru
Fossils of Poland
Fossils of Russia
Fossils of Spain
Fossils of Sweden
Fossils of Tajikistan
Fossils of Thailand
Fossils of Ukraine
Fossils of the United States
Fossils of Uzbekistan
Fossils of Venezuela
Fossils of Vietnam
Silurian first appearances
Frasnian extinctions
Fossils of Georgia (U.S. state)
Jeffersonville Limestone
Paleontology in New Hampshire
Paleozoic life of Ontario
Paleozoic life of Alberta
Paleozoic life of British Columbia
Floresta Formation
Paleozoic life of Manitoba
Paleozoic life of New Brunswick
Paleozoic life of the Northwest Territories
Paleozoic life of Nova Scotia
Paleozoic life of Nunavut
Paleozoic life of Quebec
Paleozoic life of Yukon
Fossil taxa described in 1828